Nankairyū Tarō (born 22 February 1965 as Kilifi Sapa) is a former sumo wrestler from Samoa. His highest rank was maegashira 2. He was the third foreign-born wrestler to reach the top makuuchi division after Takamiyama and Konishiki. However he quit sumo suddenly in September 1988 after an argument with the head coach of Takasago stable about his persistent drinking problem. He subsequently had a brief spell as a professional wrestler with New Japan.

Career
Born in Apia, Western Samoa, he joined Takasago stable in 1984, after he responded to a TV recruitment campaign placed by a Japanese businessman. He was picked out of a group of around 300 youths by the former sekiwake Takamiyama. Another Samoan, Nanyozakura (Fofoga Faaleva), joined at the same time. Sapa was given the fighting name of Nankairyū, or "South Seas dragon." Although he was not unusually large for sumo he was a superb athlete and was dedicated to training. He was highly thought of by his stable-mate Konishiki and also yokozuna Chiyonofuji, who saw that Nankairyū had a similar physique to himself and sought him out to train with.

In 1987 he fought the Taiwanese wrestler Tochinohana in the jūryō division, which according to the Japan Sumo Association was the first ever bout between two foreign sekitori. In November 1987 he became the third non-Asian sumo wrestler, after Takamiyama and Konishiki, to reach the top makuuchi division. In May 1988 he reached his highest rank of maegashira 2 and upset ōzeki Hokuten'yū. He also looked to have defeated yokozuna Ōnokuni but a rematch was called, which he lost.

Nankairyū was a heavy drinker, and received adverse publicity after he got into a confrontation with a hotel clerk while drunk in July 1987. His problem was made worse by the fact that he spoke neither English nor Japanese well, needing a Samoan interpreter around his stable, and consequently he had difficulty making himself understood to the Japanese media. On the 14th day of the September 1988 tournament he withdrew claiming a stomach complaint, but in fact he had drunk so much the night before he was in no condition to compete. He had a heated argument with his stable boss, former yokozuna Asashio Tarō III, who told him to choose between sumo and the bottle, and Nankairyū fled the stable to go back to Samoa. The head of the Sumo Association Futagoyama, declared that Nankairyū would never be allowed to compete again even if he did return. Nankairyū remained listed on the banzuke for the November 1988 tournament as retirement papers were not forwarded until October, after the new rankings were drawn up. This oversight prevented Hananofuji from taking Nankairyū's top division spot, as he was moved from jūryō 1 West to jūryō 1 East instead. (Hananofuji was never to reach makuuchi in his career.) His stablemaster died of a stroke just a few weeks after Nankairyū ran away, on October 23, 1988.

Nankairyu told a Japanese weekly newspaper after he had returned to Western Samoa that "there are too many rules in sumo. After a match, you go back to the stable and all they do is order you around like a child."

After sumo
Nankairyū became a professional wrestler for New Japan in September 1990, joining Tatsumi Fujinami's "Dragon Bombers" unit with Takashi Iizuka and Taylor Wily, but soon returned to Western Samoa after no success in the business.

Career record

See also
Glossary of sumo terms
List of non-Japanese sumo wrestlers
List of past sumo wrestlers

References

1965 births
Living people
Samoan sumo wrestlers
Sportspeople from Apia